The Great Disruptors is the first EP by American rock band Sweethead and was released on July 13, 2009. It included a cover of The Kinks' "Tired of Waiting for You" which can also be downloaded for free at the band's website.

Track listing
All tracks written by Sims, Van Leeuwen, Nappi and Block except where noted.

Personnel
Sweethead
Serrina Sims – vocals
Troy Van Leeuwen –  guitar, backing vocals, keyboards, bass
Eddie Nappi – bass
Norm Block – drums

Production personnel
Troy Van Leeuwen – production, mixing, engineering 
Eddie Nappi – engineering
Alain Johannes – mastering

References

External links

2009 debut EPs
Sweethead albums